The 1962–63 season was the 39th season in the existence of AEK Athens F.C. and the fourth consecutive season in the top flight of Greek football. They competed in the Alpha Ethniki and the Greek Cup. The season began on 27 September 1962 and finished on 7 July 1963.

Overview

Since the beginning of the previous season, Nikos Goumas had set his sights on AEK Athens winning the league. With a series of actions and without sparing any expenses, he tried to upgrade the club at all levels. The Nea Filadelfeia Stadium had already been modernized by acquiring turf and reconstructed spectator stands and since January 1962, when it was officially inaugurated, was the most modern stadium in Greece. The legendary Kleanthis Maropoulos, now an agent of in the club, with the task of protecting the team from any behind-the-scenes attacks. The transfer reinforcement of the team in the summer of 1962 was a precursor of the good presence of the club in this season. In that transfer period, the international Syrian striker, Ibrahim Mughrabi, who came to Athens and AEK after leaving his studies in Damascus, Manolis Kanellopoulos, Sofos Koulidis and Manolis Klikopoulos from Egaleo, the goalkeeper Vangelis Petrakis from Aris and most importantly of Mimis Papaioannou from Veria. All of the above was preceded by the arrival and assumption of duties as the team's coach, the Hungarian-German Jenő Csaknády, a successful coach in the Bundesliga, which was an unapproachable size for the Greek data of the time. Csaknády showed from the beginning that he intended to put AEK in the professional model of big European clubs with his main weapons being the iron discipline and the equal treatment of everyone, regardless of name and reputation, without, of course, lagging behind in sophisticated training methods and tactical systems. The insightful Csaknády, after a few days of training, understood the value and quality of the "treasure" that was hidden behind the young Papaioannou and expressing his intention to use him immediately and as a key member, he forced the managers to rush to Veria and pay the fee of 175 thousand drachmas requested by the people of his club to immediately include the player in the team's roster without waiting for his "release" after the usual one year ban from the pitches. The discipline that was now part of everyday life in the yellow-blacks, although it deprived the great Kostas Nestoridis of his participation in the August friendly against Barcelona at the Camp Nou, thus paying together with Mimis Anastasiadis the their late arrival for the previous friendly against Panegialios, endowed the team with admirable cohesion, players who gave everything for each other and all together for the whole and absolute commitment to the great goal of winning the title. The German "standards" of Csaknády mandated the start of preparation from August 1, in contrast to the Greek teams that considered a few days' preparation of 15–20 days, starting after August 15, to be sufficient. The early gathering of the players and the non-negotiable attitude of Csaknády on this issue may have "cost" the captain, Andreas Stamatiadis a few days of the family vacation to Italy, but they shielded the players with increased levels physical condition, capable of helping her cope with the demands of the Championship with complete success.

The start of the league showed that the scenario of the previous seasons would be repeated with AEK and Panathniakos fighting for the title and Olympiacos waiting to take advantage of their possible missteps by chasing and this his first title in the established first national division. The excessive certainty of the "greens" for a new Championship conquest was so such that led them not to strengthen the already existing team by transfer, considering it too complete. The big three engaged in a battle winning and losing points and after AEK prevailed over Olympiacos at Karaiskakis Stadium by 1–3 on the 13th matchday, they found themselves at the top together with 33 points. However, on February, the defeat at the same stadium by Ethnikos, removed the yellow-blacks from the top and filled them with pessimism. AEK responded with a counterattack, starting with a streak of 8 consecutive victories from the 19th matchday to the 26th matchday and combined with the draw of Panathinaikos in the same matchday, they found themselves at the top of the table. The following matchday against Panathinaikos at home in an inconclusive match despite AEK's laziness, they lost by 0–2 and the greens were the undisputed favorite for their fourth consecutive title. After the end of the three final matches AEK and Panathinaikos were tied at the top with 77 points each. The regulation of the championship stipulated a play-off match between the two and in the event of a tie declared the team with the best goal ration in the regular season as the Champion.

On June 23 AEK and Panathinaikos lined up in the Stadium of Nea Filadelfeia, has been chosen as the venue for the match. Panathinaikos took the lead in the 8th minute with a goal by Toumelis, but immediately after that the Papaioannou-Nestoridis duo took action with two goals by the former in the 23rd and 27th minute and one by the latter in 39th minute made it 3–1, bringing AEK close to the Title. The "greens" took advantage of a period of inactivity of AEK and with goals from Linoxilakis in the 64th minute and Panagiotidis in the 65th minute, equalized the match at 3–3. This was the final score as a and even though Panathinaikos was superior in goal difference as they had +47 against the +45 of AEK, but the goal ratio defined by the regulation gave AEK the title with 3.14 against 2.68 of the "greens". Kostas Nestoridis, for the 5th time in a row and for the last time in his career, was the top scorer in the Championship with 23 goals.

In the Greek Cup, AEK reached the round of 32 without a match, just like all the teams that had reached the round of 16 in the previous season. There they defeated Olympiacos Kalamata with 7–1 at home and qualified to the round of 16, where they got the ticket for the quarter-finals by eliminating Atromitos with a 0–3 victory at Peristeri. In the quarter-finals, Aris, with a header from Panitsidis in the 9th minute, defeated AEK by 1–0 at Thessaloniki and eliminated them from the tournament.

Players

Squad information

NOTE: The players are the ones that have been announced by the AEK Athens' press release. No edits should be made unless a player arrival or exit is announced. Updated 7 July 1963, 23:59 UTC+2.

Transfers

In

Out

Renewals

Overall transfer activity

Expenditure:  ₯175,000

Income:  ₯0

Net Total:  ₯175,000

Pre-season and friendlies

Alpha Ethniki

League table

Results summary

Results by Matchday

Fixtures

Championship play-off

Greek Cup

Matches

Statistics

Squad statistics

! colspan="9" style="background:#FFDE00; text-align:center" | Goalkeepers
|-

! colspan="9" style="background:#FFDE00; color:black; text-align:center;"| Defenders
|-

! colspan="9" style="background:#FFDE00; color:black; text-align:center;"| Midfielders
|-

! colspan="9" style="background:#FFDE00; color:black; text-align:center;"| Forwards
|-

|}

Disciplinary record

|-
! colspan="14" style="background:#FFDE00; text-align:center" | Goalkeepers

|-
! colspan="14" style="background:#FFDE00; color:black; text-align:center;"| Defenders

|-
! colspan="14" style="background:#FFDE00; color:black; text-align:center;"| Midfielders

|-
! colspan="14" style="background:#FFDE00; color:black; text-align:center;"| Forwards

|-
|}

References

External links
AEK Athens F.C. Official Website

AEK Athens F.C. seasons
AEK Athens
1962-63